Depressaria krasnowodskella is a moth of the family Depressariidae. It is found in Turkmenistan and Portugal.

References

External links
lepiforum.de

Moths described in 1953
Depressaria
Moths of Asia
Moths of Europe